Andrew Richard Graham Gilmour (born August 4, 1970, Salisbury (now Harare)) is a Zimbabwean first-class cricketer who played for Mashonaland cricket team, Mashonaland Under-24s cricket team in 1994 to 1996 as left-handed wicket-keeper batsman for six first-class match scored 109 runs with 19 catches and 2 stampings.

References

External links
 
 

1970 births
Living people
Zimbabwean cricketers
Sportspeople from Harare
Mashonaland cricketers
Wicket-keepers